Sol-fa may refer to:

Sol-fa (album), a 2004 album by Asian Kung-Fu Generation
Solfège, a music education method
Tonic sol-fa, a method of teaching sight-singing
Tonic Sol-fa (a cappella group), a quartet from Minnesota